Osymetric is a French make of ovoid bicycle chainring which has a non-circular shape whose angle is tailored to the pedal stroke of the individual cyclist.  These were designed by engineer Jean-Louis Talo who claims that this improves cycling performance.  Such chainrings were used by professional cyclists Bradley Wiggins and Chris Froome for their Tour de France victories.

See also
 Biopace

References

Cycle parts manufacturers